Paul Pepper is a TV host, and currently hosts a local-focused interview radio show, titled "Radio Friends with Paul Pepper" on KBIA 91.3, mid-Missouri's public radio station. Paul Pepper is a former weatherman for KOMU-TV which serves the central Missouri area (based just south of Columbia, Missouri).

On Friday, September 18, 2009 the TV show Pepper and Friends went off-air after 6343 shows. Paul Pepper now hosts a radio program titled "Radio Friends with Paul Pepper" on KBIA 91.3

External links
 News of the Show Cancellation
 

People from Columbia, Missouri
Living people
Year of birth missing (living people)